Saturnalia ( foaled 21 March 2016) is a Japanese Thoroughbred racehorse. In 2018 he was rated the second-best two-year-old in Japan as he was undefeated in three starts including the Grade 1 Hopeful Stakes on his final appearance of the season. On his three-year-old debut he added another Grade 1 success as he took the Satsuki Sho but was beaten when odds-on favourite for the Tokyo Yushun. Later in the year he won the Kobe Shimbun Hai and finished second in the Arima Kinen.

Background
Saturnalia is a dark bay or brown horse with a white star bred in Japan by Northern Farm. During his racing career he was owned by U Carrot Farm. The colt was sent into training with Katsuhiko Sumii.

Saturnalia was from the second crop of foals sired by Lord Kanaloa, an outstanding sprinter-miler who was voted Japanese Horse of the Year in 2013. Saturnalia's dam Cesario was a top-class racemare won the Yushun Himba and the American Oaks and went on to produce the Japan Cup winner Epiphaneia and the Asahi Hai Futurity Stakes winner Leontes. She was a fourth-generation descendant of the Epsom Oaks winner Pia. As a fourth-generation descendant of the Epsom Oaks winner Pia, Cesario was related to other major winners, including Chief Singer and Pleasantly Perfect.

Racing career

2018: two-year-old season
Saturnalia began his racing career in a maiden race over 1600 metres at Hanshin Racecourse on 10 June 2018 and won from Deep Diver and seven others. After a break of more than four months, the colt returned for the Listed Hagi Stakes over 1800 metres at Kyoto Racecourse on 27 October and won again, beating Jamil Fuerte and six others. When Sumii was banned from training horses after a drunk driving conviction Saturnalia's conditioning was handled by Kazuya Nakatake.

On 28 December, Saturnalia was stepped up in class to contest the Grade 1 Hopeful Stakes over 2000 metres at Nakayama Racecourse. Ridden by Mirco Demuro, he was made the 0.8/1 favourite ahead of twelve opponents including the Tokyo Sports Hai Nisai Stakes winner Nishino Daisy. After racing in second place behind the front-running Cosmo Calendula, Saturnalia produced a strong run in the straight, took the lead in the closing stages and won by one and a half lengths from Admire Justa, with third place going to Nishino Daisy. After the race Demuro said "I feel great. I knew I was riding the strongest two-year-old of the season. He really showed his strength though squeezing his way through the narrow opening. I am really looking forward to his three-year-old season".

In the official ratings for Japanese two-year-olds Saturnalia was rated the second best juvenile of the year, one pond behind the Asahi Hai Futurity Stakes winner Admire Mars. In January 2019 Saturnalia finished second to the Admire Mars in the polling for the Best Two-Year-Old Colt at the JRA Awards for 2018 receiving 123 votes against his rivals 153.

2019: three-year-old season

Saturnalia moved back to the stable of Katsuhiko Sumii for the 2019 season. For his first run of the season the colt contested the Grade 1 Satsuki Sho, the first leg of the Japanese Triple Crown over 2000 metres at Nakayama on 14 April. In the run-up to the race his assistant trainer Yasuyuki Tsujino said "Things have been fine with him, his breathing's good, and he's run well in training with control and power... He's come along very well, and I don’t think he's been fully extended." Ridden for the first time by Christophe Lemaire he was made the 0.7/1 favourite ahead of Admire Mars in an eighteen-runner field which included Velox, Danon Kingly, Fantasist (Keio Hai Nisai Stakes) and Meisho Tengen (Yayoi Sho). After racing in mid-division in the early stages, Saturnalia moved forward on the final turn and made a strong challenge in the straight taking the lead from Velox 200 metres from the finish. Velox rallied, while Danon Kingly produced a strong run up the inside rail but Saturnalia prevailed by a head and a nose. After the race Lemaire said "I rode him for the first time in the race but I had confidence in him. He seemed a bit nervous and drifted towards the inside when we took command before the crowd. His condition was not 100% as it was his first start this year but he should be in top condition going into the Japanese Derby."

On 26 May Saturnalia started the 0.6/1 favourite against seventeen opponents for the Tokyo Yushun over 2400 metres and was ridden by Damian Lane. After racing in eleventh place for most of the way he made rapid progress in the straight but never looked likely to catch the leaders and came home fourth behind Roger Barows, Danon Kingly and Velox, beaten three and a quarter lengths by the winner.

After an absence of almost four months Saturnalia returned in the Kobe Shinbun Hai over 2400 metres at Hanshin on 22 September and started the odds-on favourite in an eight-runner field. Lemaire settled the colt in second place behind the front-running Sifflement before taking the lead in the straight. Saturnalia drew away in the closing tagess to win by three lengths from Velox with a further length and a quarter back to World Premiere in third place. Lemaire commented "He showed his strength today. He needed a horse in front of him and he relaxed in the back straight. His start was no good in the Derby but it was good today. Looking forward to the future, I'm sure he's a super horse".

On 27 October Saturnalia faced older for the first time in the autumn edition of the Tenno Sho over 2000 metres at Tokyo and started the 2.4/1 second favourite in a sixteen-runner field. He raced in third place for most of the way before fading in the straight and coming home sixth behind Almond Eye. For his final run of the year Saturnalia was matched against older horses again in the Arima Kinen over 2500 metres at Nakayama on 22 December. He raced towards the rear of the field before staying on strongly in the straight to take second place behind the five-year-old mare Lys Gracieux.

In January 2020, at the JRA Awards for 2019, Saturnalia was voted Best Three-Year-Old Colt, beating Admire Mars by 124 votes to 107.

2020: four-year-old season
On his first run as a four-year-old, Saturnalia started the odds-on favourite for the Grade 2 Kinko Sho over 2000 metres at Chukyo Racecourse on 15 March when his ten rivals included Lord My Way (Challenge Cup), Last Draft (Keisei Stakes) and Nishino Daisy. He settled in fifth place before moving up on the outside in the straight, taking the lead inside the last 100 metres and winning by two lengths from the 40/1 outsider Satono Saltus. At Hanshin 28 June Saturnalia was made the 1.4/1 favourite for the 61st edition of the Grade 1 Takarazuka Kinen over 2200 metres. He raced towards the rear along the inside rail before being switched to the outside in the straight but despite making steady progress he was unable to threaten the leaders and came home fourth behind Chrono Genesis, Kiseki and Mozu Bello.

In the 2020 World's Best Racehorse Rankings, Saturnalia was rated on 120, making him the equal 40th best racehorse in the world.

Pedigree

References

2016 racehorse births
Racehorses bred in Japan
Racehorses trained in Japan
Thoroughbred family 16-a